P. G. Karuthiruman was an Indian politician and a who served as the fourth and last Opposition Leader of Madras State and first Opposition Leader of Tamil Nadu . He was elected to the Tamil Nadu legislative assembly as an Indian National Congress candidate from Nambiyur constituency in 1952, and then Gobichettipalayam constituency in 1957 election and from Sathyamangalam constituency in 1967 election. who served as the fourth and last Opposition Leader OF Madras State from 1967 until 1971 He was born in a small village near Gobichettipalayam called Nanjai Puliyambatti.
He was a true Gandhian by principle and practice. He stood for the people and constituency that he represented and had clear vision and broad outlook for the state and country as well. A very simple and easily approachable person he was and he had the confidence of great leaders like Shri. K. Kamaraj the then CM of Tamil Nadu and Bharat Ratna Shri C. Subramaniam. He widely traveled across the globe and brought many accolades to the country.
Apart from being a political leader he was also a great scholar in Tamil literature especially in the great epic Kamba Ramayanam. He contributed many articles books and speeches on this subject.

References 

Indian National Congress politicians from Tamil Nadu
Living people
India MPs 1962–1967
Lok Sabha members from Tamil Nadu
Leaders of the Opposition in Tamil Nadu
People from Tiruppur district
Year of birth missing (living people)